Petites was a small place with 11 families near Rose Blanche, Newfoundland and Labrador, Canada. It had a population of 212 in 1946 and 146 in 1956. It was resettled in 2003.

References

See also
 List of communities in Newfoundland and Labrador

Populated places in Newfoundland and Labrador